The Ninpiden (a.k.a. Shinobi Hiden, or Legends of Ninja Secrets) is an authentic ninjutsu manual written by Hattori Hanzō in 1560. It is regarded as one of the three key historical texts of ninjutsu, along with the Shōninki and the Bansenshukai. It was passed down in the Hattori family, and was considered a secret transmission; it was not shared with outsiders and even within the family, few had access to it.

References

Bibliography
 Antony Cummins & Yoshie Minami, eds. & trans. The Secret Traditions of the Shinobi: Hattori Hanzo's Shinobi Hiden and Other Ninja Scrolls. Berkeley, Calif.: Blue Snake Books, 2012.

Ninjutsu
Martial arts manuals